Zygaena punctum is a species of moth in the family Zygaenidae. It is found in Poland, the Czech Republic, Slovakia, Austria, Slovenia, Italy, the Balkan Peninsula, Moldova, Ukraine, Russia and Turkey.

Technical description and variation (Seitz) 

Z. punctum O. Represents the preceding African insect [ Zygaena favonia Frr.] in the South of Europe. Position of the red spots as in Zygaena sarpedon, but the apical spot enlarged, appearing washed out, being deeper red centrally and pale at the edges. Red abdominal belt always absent. Name-typical punctum occurs at the north-east coasts of the Mediterranean Sea, as far as Armenia; small, the markings of forewing more or less confluent, the hindmargin remaining broadly black. — In dystrepta Fisch.-Wald. [ now Zygaena punctum dystrepta Fischer de Waldheim, 1832], from S. E. Europe and Asia Minor, the hindmargin is only very narrowly shaded with black, the forewing being otherwise all blood-red except distal margin; this colour replaced by miniate [red lead or vermilion] in a specimen from Asia Minor received from Messrs. Staudinger and Bang-Haas under the name of malatina — italica Stgr.-Reb. [italica Stgr.-Reb. now a synonym of punctum] is a more densely scaled and therefore brighter coloured form from South and Central Italy, the apical patch being distinctly separated from the basal area by a narrow black interspace, while in the much larger contamineoides Stgr. (= contaminei Zell, dalmatina H.-Sch.) [ now Z. punctum ssp. ledereri Rambur, 1858 ], from Spain, Italy, and Sicily, a broad interspace isolates the apical spot completely. — Larva greenish, with white dorsal line and subdorsal rows of black dots, below which there are larger yellow spots. Head and thoracical legs black, abdominal legs yellow; in May and June on Eryngium. The imago in July at very limited localities, but rather common, flying low. 
The wingspan is 25–30 mm.

Biology

Adults are on wing from the end of May to July.

The larvae feed on Eryngium species. The species overwinters in the larval stage. Full-grown larvae can be found in May.

Subspecies
Zygaena punctum punctum
Zygaena punctum dalmatina Boisduval, 1834
Zygaena punctum dystrepta Fischer de Waldheim, 1832
Zygaena punctum itala Burgeff, 1926
Zygaena punctum kalavrytica Reiss, 1962
Zygaena punctum kefersteinii Herrich-Schaffer, 1846
Zygaena punctum ledereri Rambur, 1858
Zygaena punctum malatina Dziurzynski, 1903

References

Moths described in 1808
Zygaena
Moths of Europe
Moths of Asia
Taxa named by Ferdinand Ochsenheimer